Two Tickets to Paris is a 1962 film directed by Greg Garrison and starring Joey Dee and the Starliters.

Plot
An engaged couple, Joey and Piper, travel to Paris where Joey has a gig performing.

Cast
Joey Dee as Joey Dee
Gary Crosby as Gary
Kay Medford as Aggie
Jeri Lynne Fraser as Piper
Lisa James as Coco
Charles Nelson Reilly as Claypoole
Richard Dickens as Tony
Nina Paige as Dumb blonde
Sal Lombardo as Marmaduke
Jeri Archer as Mrs. Patten
Michele Moinot as Le Claire
Jay Burton as Charles

Production
The film was made independently by Harry Romm, who had produced Hey, Let's Twist (1961). He used the same director of that film, Greg Garrison, and cast Joey Dee, who was known for the Peppermint Twist. It was originally going to be called Viva La Twist but this was changed.

The cast included Gary Crosby who had been in many film musicals such as Mardi Gras, and Kay Medford, who had been in Bye Bye Birdie on stage. The film was shot in May 1962 at a studio in New York, the Production Center on 221 West Street, with some filming about a liner and the Rountable nightclub. Filming finished by 8 June.

Columbia agreed to distribute.

Reception
The New York Times called the film "pitiful". The Monthly Film Bulletin criticised the "meagre and labouriously contrived story... the dialogue is unfunny."

A soundtrack album was released.

References

External links

1962 films
1962 musical comedy films
American black-and-white films
American musical comedy films
Columbia Pictures films
Films set on ships
1960s English-language films
1960s American films